American musician Lauv has released two studio albums, one compilation album, two remix albums, ten extended plays, 30 singles (including five as a featured artist), and three promotional singles.

Albums

Studio albums

Compilation albums

Remix albums

Extended plays

Singles

As lead artist

As featured artist

Promotional singles

Other charted and certified songs

Songwriting credits

Music videos

Notes

References

Discographies of American artists
Pop music discographies